Marta Hernández Romero, born in Santiago de Cuba, was the mayor of Havana, Cuba, she was elected on 5 March 2011. She  is the President of the People's Power Provincial Assembly of the City of Havana (mayor),  diputada to the National Assembly, and a member of the Council of State in the VI Legislature.  Soon before being elected as the mayor of the city, she was elected as a delegate to the VI Communist Party Congress and frontrunner to be a member of the Central Committee of the Cuban Communist Party.

She holds a Master of Education, began her career teaching elementary school and reached the position of provincial Director of Education, first in her native Santiago de Cuba and then, since 2003, in Havana.

Hernandez replaces Juan Contino Aslan, who left office in February 2011.

She left office in January 2020 and was replaced by Reinaldo García Zapata.

References

External links

Official National Assembly website

Living people
1958 births
People from Santiago de Cuba
Mayors of places in Cuba
Communist Party of Cuba politicians
Members of the National Assembly of People's Power
Women mayors